Ceilândia is an administrative region in the Federal District in Brazil. With about 398,374 inhabitants, it is the administrative region of largest population in the Federal District.

History
Ceilândia was created by the government in the 1970s to keep people from moving into Brasília and setting up invasions. The root of the name Ceilândia is "CEI".

In 1969, after only nine years of existence, Brasília already had 79,128 people living in irregular occupations, out of a population of 500 thousand inhabitants in all the Federal District.  In that year a seminar took place in Brasília concerning social problems of the Federal District. Invasion dwellers were the most serious problem.  The Governor at that time, Hélio Prates da Silveira, decided to eradicate the invasions and a commission was formed.

17619 lots were laid out and in 1970 the first construction began.  In nine months the transfer of the families was concluded with the streets opening. The beginning was dramatic.  The population had no water, no public lighting, no public transport and struggled against dust, mud and flash floods.

Today Ceilândia is the largest electoral college of the Federal District and the most populous city, with more inhabitants than the Brasília. It occupies a total of 91 residential squares laid out like Brasília, intercalated by areas for local commerce, churches and schools.  There are also some special areas that are set aside to provide community services.

An active commercial center, it has 4,500 commercial establishments and 1,600 small industries. The economically active population is more than 160,000 people.

The building was designed by Oscar Niemeyer and completed in 1986.

Ceilândia and its fairs
Ceilândia is considered the second largest "Northeastern city" outside the Brazilian Northeast Region (the first one is São Paulo). About 70% of the population is of Northeastern origin. The presence of the Northeast culture can be seen in the number of open-air fairs (13 in all).

The fairs are also an alternative for the workers that did not find space in the economy of the Federal District. In most of them, fruits, foods, clothes and footwear are commercialized. The Fair of the Producer sells wholesale and supplies almost 50% of the Federal District.

The Central Fair, is the largest of all. It occupies an area of seven thousand square meters and sells household articles, tools, electric appliances, fruits, vegetables, and poultry.

See also
List of administrative regions of the Federal District

References

External links

 Regional Administration of Ceilândia website
 Government of the Federal District website

Administrative regions of Federal District (Brazil)